Eunidia quinquemaculata is a species of beetle in the family Cerambycidae. Known from Zambia, Mozambique, Zimbabwe, and Malawi, it was described by Stephan von Breuning in 1939.

References

Eunidiini
Beetles described in 1939